Basketball is included in top sports being played in Japan but it is less popular than football and baseball.

Team 
B. League is a professional league in Japan that has been established last 2016. It is a combination of Super League and bj league enforced by FIBA.

B. League has 3 divisions, with 18 teams in Divisions 1 and 2. Meanwhile, Division 3 only has 12 teams. 

It has captured the growing popularity of the sport among the young people of Japan. It has developed homegrown players that are now playing in NBA like Rui Hachimura.

Competitions

1976 World Olympics 
This was the last major appearance of the National Team at the Olympics. The Women's National Team reached its highest ranking, at 5th place.

2019 FIBA World Cup 
The Men's National Team was able to enter after a great performance during the qualifiers, even though they ranked #48 in the world. They ranked #31 in the final standings of the competition.

The Women's National Team ranked #9 in this competition.

2020 Tokyo Olympics 
Since Japan is the host country for this Olympic Games, the Men and Women's National Teams automatically qualified for this competition. However, the games were postponed to a later date due to the COVID-19 pandemic.

References

External links 

Basketball in Japan